Dastjerd Rural District is in Gugan District of Azarshahr County, East Azerbaijan province, Iran. At the census of 2006, its population was 4,944 in 1,289 households; there were 5,561 inhabitants in 1,698 households at the following census of 2011; and in the most recent census of 2016, the population of the rural district was 5,083 in 1,638 households. The largest of its six villages was Firuz Salar, with 2,582 people.

References 

Azarshahr County

Rural Districts of East Azerbaijan Province

Populated places in East Azerbaijan Province

Populated places in Azarshahr County